Crisco is a surname. Notable people with the surname include:

Joseph Crisco, American engineer
Joseph Crisco Jr. (born 1934), American politician
Keith Crisco (1943–2014), American businessman and public official

English-language surnames